Welsh Run is an unincorporated community in Montgomery Township in Franklin County, Pennsylvania, United States. Welsh Run is located at the intersection of state routes 416 and 995, southeast of Mercersburg.

A post office called Welsh Run was established in 1830, and remained in operation until 1906. A large share of the first settlers being natives of Wales caused the name to be selected.

References

Unincorporated communities in Franklin County, Pennsylvania
Unincorporated communities in Pennsylvania